Comparison of CPUs may refer to:
 Comparison of CPU microarchitectures
 Comparison of instruction set architectures

See also 
 List of AMD microprocessors
 List of Intel microprocessors